Limenitis helmanni    is a  butterfly found in the  East Palearctic   that belongs to the browns family.

Subspecies
L. h. helmanni Zailiisky Altatau Mountains, Altai
L. h. pryeri  (Moore, 1877)   Chekiang
L. h. duplicata Staudinger, 1892   Amur, Ussuri, Northeast China, Korea
L. h. chosensis Matsumura, 1929   Korea
L. h. sichuanensis  (Sugiyama, 1994)  China (Shaanxi, Jiangxi)
L. h. meicunensis  Yoshino, 2016    China (Fujian, Guangdong, Guangxi, Jiangxi)
L. h. misuji Sugiyama, 1994   Sichuan
L. h. wenpingae    Huang, 2003   Yunnan

Description from Seitz

L. helmanni Led. (57b) has the ground-colour blackish brown, the pattern being similar to that of the preceding species [Limenitis camilla; the cell of the forewing, however, bears a whitish basal streak followed distally by a white acutely triangular spot; the while spots of the central area are small and isolated, and the band of the hindwing, which is directed towards the centre of the hindmargin, is composed of separated spots. On the hindwing above there are sometimes small, whitish, elongate, submarginal spots. Central Asia: Altai, eastern districts of Amurland; West and Central China; Corea. — pryeri Moore is on an average larger, the white markings are widened, both wings have distinct while sumarginal spots, the underside is more strongly marked with more prominent white spots on the hindwing. North-East China (Ning-po), Ussuri, Amurland, Corea, Japan. — In duplicata Stgr. male 61d, 57b underside of female, erroneously named doerriesi U. on plate) the increase in the size of the white markings reaches its maximum; the band of the hindwing is continuous and of double or threefold width. Amurland).

Biology
The larva feeds on Lonicera altaica,  Lonicera tatarica, Lonicera maackii

See also
List of butterflies of Russia

References

Limenitis